Khedouri Aboody Zilkha (1884–1956) was an Iraqi-Jewish banker.

Early life
Khedouri Zilkha was born in Baghdad in 1884 (or 1886), the only son of the textile merchant Aboudi Zilkha (1862–1904).

Career
He started as a banker in Baghdad in 1902, founding Zilkha Bank, and gradually expanded to Beirut (Banque Zilkha), Damascus, Cairo, Alexandria, Geneva, New  York, Paris and the Far East.

In 1941 or 1942, he emigrated to New York and died there in 1956.

Personal life
He married Louise (Bashi) Zilkha and had four sons and three daughters:
Ezra Zilkha 
Selim Zilkha
Maurice Zilkha 
Abdullah Zilkha
Helene Zilkha
Hanina Zilkha
Bertie Zilkha

His son Ezra was an American financier and philanthropist.  His son Selim is a British entrepreneur who founded the large Mothercare chain.  His son Abdullah ran an investment bank in Zurich named Ufitec.  His son Maurice was an Egyptian banker.

Legacy
His son Ezra established in his father's memory the Khedouri Zilkha Fund for the Study of the History of Jewish Civilization in the Near East at Princeton University. The fund supports a professorship, the current holder of which is Marina Rustow and past holders Mark R. Cohen and Abraham Udovitch.

References

External links

1880s births
1956 deaths
Iraqi Jews
People from Baghdad
Khedouri
Iraqi bankers
Iraqi emigrants to the United States